Berkeley Institute (New York) 1886-1956
The Berkeley Institute, a public senior high school established in Pembroke Parish, Bermuda in 1897
Berkeley Institute for Data Science part of University of California, Berkeley